Héctor Darío Benítez Hoppe (born 5 January 1980) is a Paraguayan former professional footballer who played as a defender.. 

He played for Nacional.

References
 
 

1980 births
Living people
Paraguayan footballers
Association football defenders
Club Libertad footballers
Club Nacional footballers
Club Olimpia footballers
Deportes Concepción (Chile) footballers
Paraguayan expatriate footballers
Paraguayan expatriate sportspeople in Chile
Expatriate footballers in Chile